The Sacobia Bridge is a road bridge in Bamban, Tarlac. The structure crosses over the Sacobia River. It is part of the New Clark City (NCC)-Clark International Airport access road which connects New Clark City with the Clark Freeport Zone. It is a six-lane  steel bridge. The bridge was designed by Budji Layug.

See also
Bamban Bridge

References

Buildings and structures in Tarlac